The September 1937 Folsom escape was an attempt by seven inmates to escape Folsom State Prison, a famous prison in the United States. During this attempt, Warden Clarence Larkin, Officer Harry Martin, and two of the escapees died. The remaining five were eventually executed.

Previous attempts 

Folsom has seen numerous escape attempts; the first one occurring shortly after the first inmates arrived in the 1880s, and the most recent in 2010. There were several escapes before this attempt, as well as after. Throughout Folsom's violent and bloody history, numerous riots and escape attempts have resulted in both inmate and staff deaths.

Attempt 
Approximately 40 inmates had been waiting to talk to Warden Larkin concerning upcoming parole hearings when seven of the inmates suddenly attacked him. As they took him into the yard, guards started firing. In the commotion that followed Officer Martin and Warden Larkin were both stabbed to death. Officer Martin died at the scene and Warden Larkin died of his wounds five days later.

The inmates involved in the attack were said to have used shanks, prison-made knives, to attack the Warden and the officer.  Also, a prison-made wooden semiautomatic pistol, carved and meant for use in the attack, was found.

One of the seven inmates who attempted to escape was Ed Davis, a notable prisoner, and he was wanted for the murder of Officer James Hill, of the Marlow, Oklahoma, Police Department, on April 20, 1931.

Two of the prisoners attempting escape were shot and killed during the incident. The remaining five were all sentenced to death and eventually executed. Robert Lee Cannon and Albert Kessel, were executed in the gas chamber on December 2, 1938. Two others, Wesley Eudy and Fred Barnes were executed on December 9, 1938. Ed Davis, the leader of the group and murderer of Officer Hill, was executed on December 16, 1938.

See also
 List of homicides in California
Folsom State Prison

References 

Escapes in the United States
1937 in the United States
Folsom
Folsom escape attempt
Murder in California